Montse Ribé (born 1972) is a Spanish make-up artist and actress. She won the Academy Award for Best Makeup for her work in Pan's Labyrinth (2006). She was one of 115 people invited to join the Academy of Motion Picture Arts and Sciences in 2007.

She portrayed young Red/Hellboy in the movie Hellboy II: The Golden Army.

References

External links

1972 births
Best Makeup Academy Award winners
Living people
Spanish make-up artists
People from Barcelona